Pammeces picticornis is a species of moth of the family Agonoxenidae. It is found in the West Indies (Puerto Rico and the U.S. Virgin Islands).

Taxonomy
The species was described in the family Coleophoridae.

References

Moths described in 1897
Agonoxeninae
Moths of the Caribbean